Doctor Who – Lost in Time is a BBC three-disc boxset DVD released in 2004. It is a collection of restored Doctor Who episodes and clips from stories that are incomplete or missing from the Corporation's archives. There were, at the time of release, 108 missing episodes, all from the black-and-white 1960s era. Although the search goes on (and eleven complete episodes, plus some clips, have been recovered since the release) many or all of these episodes may be lost forever—hence this collection's title. 

The Region 2 and Region 4 releases are a single three-disc set. In Region 1, it is available as two separate releases (a single-disc William Hartnell DVD and a two-disc Patrick Troughton set) or as a single three-disc set.

Content

Footage found in the set varies from complete episodes to extremely short surviving clips that were cut either for time or for censorship reasons. Several episodes in the set include commentary tracks moderated by Gary Russell and featuring actors and crew from the original productions.

For budget reasons, Lost in Time does not feature text commentary or a photo gallery (unlike most other Doctor Who DVD releases).

Hartnell Era
 The Reign of Terror: Brief 8mm clips from episodes 4 and 5 (only seconds in run time), made by a fan pointing a mute cine camera at a TV screen during transmission. These have been synced up with the appropriate sections from the extant soundtrack.
 The Crusade: Episodes 1 and 3, plus soundtracks for 2 and 4. Also includes introduction and linking material provided by actor William Russell in character as Ian Chesterton (originally recorded for the 1999 VHS release of the story and accessible when the story is viewed via the "Play All" option). Episode 3 has a commentary option featuring actor Julian Glover, with its production slate hidden as an "Easter Egg".
 Galaxy 4: A lengthy sequence from episode 1, plus an off-air film recording clip from the beginning of the episode. The lengthy sequence is not included on this disc, instead kept within The Missing Years—see below.
 The Myth Makers: Off-air film recording clips from episodes 1, 2 & 4 (later found out to actually be from all 4 episodes).
 The Daleks' Master Plan: Episodes 2, 5 and 10, plus mute film sequences from episodes 1 & 2, plus clips from episodes 3 & 4. Episode 2 has a commentary option featuring actors Peter Purves and Kevin Stoney, and designer Raymond Cusick.
 The Celestial Toymaker: Episode 4.
 The Savages: Off-air 8mm film recording clips of episode 4 (later found out to actually be from episodes 3 & 4).
 The Smugglers: Brief censor clips from episodes 1, 3 & 4 and amateur footage showing the filming on-location (not episode clips).
 The Tenth Planet: Various footage from Episode 4, including off-air film recordings (poor quality). A short film reel of ‘the renewal’ (regeneration) scene of William Hartnell also exists.

Troughton Era
 The Power of the Daleks: Clips from episodes 1, 2, 4, 5 and 6 including footage re-used in surviving programs, off-air 8mm film recordings and trailers aired on the BBC ahead of the original transmission.
 The Highlanders: Censored clips from episode 1 and some on-location footage (poor quality).
 The Underwater Menace: Episode 3 and censored clips from episodes 1, 2 and 4. This episode was, at the time, the earliest surviving episode to feature Patrick Troughton as the Doctor and Frazer Hines as Jamie McCrimmon. (Actor Frazer Hines' introduction to this episode from an earlier VHS boxset is also included as an "Easter Egg".)
 The Moonbase: Episodes 2 and 4, plus soundtracks for 1 and 3.
 The Macra Terror: Clips including censored footage from episodes 2 & 3 and off-air 8mm film recordings from episode 3.
 The Faceless Ones: Episodes 1 and 3, plus a clip from an off-air film recording of episode 2.
 The Evil of the Daleks: Episode 2, with a commentary option featuring actor Deborah Watling moderated by Gary Russell. Also The Last Dalek—footage showing the filming of model and effects sequences at Ealing Studios, and a recreated climactic sequence combining this footage with the original soundtrack (see The Missing Years, below).
 The Abominable Snowmen: Episode 2, clips from episode 4, and amateur footage showing the filming on-location. There is a commentary option on the episode featuring Deborah Watling.
 The Enemy of the World: Episode 3. 
 The Web of Fear: Episode 1 plus censored clips from episodes 2, 4 & 5, with a commentary option on the episode featuring Deborah Watling and story editor Derrick Sherwin.
 Fury from the Deep: Censored clips from episodes 2, 4 & 5, footage from the filming of the final episode in studio, and a recreated climactic sequence combining such footage with the original soundtrack.
 The Wheel in Space: Episodes 3 and 6 plus censored clips from episodes 4 and 5, the latter episode with a commentary option featuring story editor Derrick Sherwin and director Tristan de Vere Cole.
 The Space Pirates: Episode 2, plus surviving film sequences from episode 1.

The Missing Years
The 1998 documentary The Missing Years is included on disc 3. It details the loss and recovery of 1960s episodes and is presented by Frazer Hines and Deborah Watling. It features the longest-extant clip from an otherwise-missing Doctor Who episode—over six minutes of episode 1 of Galaxy 4; a version of "The Final End" recreating the climax of The Evil of the Daleks; fan Ian Levine stating that he believes there will never be fewer than 110 missing episodes, then begging to be proven wrong (which he later was:  there are 97 episodes missing); and a lengthy recreation of the first regeneration sequence put together from all that exists of the end of The Tenth Planet and the start of The Power of the Daleks. The feature was previously released on VHS.

In its original form, this documentary was presented in an earlier VHS boxset (The Ice Warriors in the UK, and with The Edge of Destruction and Dr. Who: The Pilot Episode in North America); both regions shared the tape with the one surviving episode of The Underwater Menace (with Hines' intro as mentioned above), which pre-dates the rediscovery of some of the Lost in Time content.

The DVD presentation includes some new footage documenting the return of two previously missing episodes—"The Lion" (episode 1 of The Crusade) was discovered in New Zealand in 1999, while "Day of Armageddon" (episode 2 of The Daleks' Master Plan) was returned in 2004 by a former BBC employee. This addendum ends the documentary.

Material found since the release

In 2005, a year after the set was released, three clips from The Power of the Daleks were found on a 1966 edition of Tomorrow's World (aired as part of the clip-filled nostalgia series Sunday Past Times) and returned to the BBC. The clips were released as parts of extras on the Genesis of the Daleks DVD ("The Dalek Tapes" documentary) and The Trial of a Time Lord DVD ("Now Get Out of That" documentary, disc three). They were subsequently included on the DVD release of The Power of the Daleks in 2016 along with the rest of the surviving footage from that serial.

In 2011, two complete previously missing episodes were returned to the BBC. The first was episode 3 of Galaxy 4, which was released (as part of a reconstruction of the whole story) on the special edition DVD of The Aztecs. The second was episode 2 of The Underwater Menace, which was included in a DVD release of that story in October 2015.

In 2013, nine more episodes were recovered: the remaining previously missing episodes of The Enemy of the World; and episodes 2, 4, 5 and 6 of The Web of Fear (leaving only episode 3 missing). Both stories were released on iTunes on the day their recovery was announced. The Enemy of the World was released on DVD in November 2013 and The Web of Fear in February 2014.

In 2019, short film trims from episodes 4 and 5 of The Power of the Daleks were found in an auction. They were included in the Special Edition release of that story in 2020 along with the rest of the surviving footage from that serial.

Other sources

Audio recordings (made off-air, by fans, at the time of transmission) exist for all of the missing episodes. They have been released by the BBC, with linking narration, and the soundtracks to the missing episodes of The Crusade and The Moonbase are included (without narration) on Lost in Time. These recordings also form the basis of the animated reconstructions of missing episodes included in the DVD releases of The Reign of Terror, The Tenth Planet, The Power of the Daleks, The Moonbase, The Macra Terror, The Faceless Ones, The Ice Warriors, The Web of Fear, Fury from the Deep and The Invasion. The existing episodes of The Reign of Terror, The Tenth Planet, The Ice Warriors and The Invasion were not included on Lost in Time (although they had been released on VHS at that point) and didn't get a DVD release until completed with animated versions of their missing episodes.

The soundtracks have also been combined with still images (mainly tele-snaps of the broadcasts) to make reconstructions that have been used on commercial releases of Marco Polo (a condensed version, as an extra on The Beginning DVD box set), Galaxy 4 (as an extra on the special edition DVD of The Aztecs) The Tenth Planet (on the VHS release and as an extra on the DVD), The Power of the Daleks (as an MP3 CD & as an extra on the DVD), The Ice Warriors (a condensed version, on the VHS release and as an extra on the DVD) and The Web of Fear (the still missing episode three, on iTunes and the DVD)—as well as being produced unofficially by fans.

See also
 Doctor Who missing episodes

References 

Doctor Who serials
Doctor Who missing episodes